Taxillusin is a flavonol found in the parasitic plant Taxillus kaempferi.  It is a galloylated 3-O-glucoside of quercetin.

References

External links 
 Taxillusin at kanaya.naist.jp

Quercetin glycosides